The Standard Chinese word xuanchuan "dissemination; propaganda; publicity" originally meant "to announce or convey information" during the 3rd-century Three Kingdoms period, and was chosen to translate Russian propagánda  in the 20th-century People's Republic of China, adopting the Marxist-Leninist concept of a "transmission belt" for indoctrination and mass mobilization. Xuanchuan is the keyword for propaganda in the People's Republic of China and propaganda in the Republic of China.

Terminology
The Chinese term xuanchuan compounds xuan  "declare; proclaim; announce" and chuan  or  "pass (on); hand down; impart; teach; spread; infect; be contagious".

Numerous common Chinese words are based upon xuanchuan, such as: xuānchuánpǐn 宣傳品 "propaganda/publicity material", xuānchuánduì 宣傳隊 "propaganda team", xuānchuánhuà 宣傳畫 "propaganda poster", xuānchuándān 宣傳單 "propaganda slips/sheets", xuānchuángǔdòng 宣傳鼓動 "agitprop", and xuānchuán diànyǐng 宣傳電影 "propaganda film".

In lexicographic terminology, a bilingual dictionary provides "translation equivalents" (rather than "definitions") between the source and target languages. Sometimes words have complete equivalents, such as translating French chien as English dog; but other times have partial or alternative equivalents, such as translating French veau as either the animal calf or the meat veal. English propaganda and publicity are alternative equivalents for Chinese xuanchuan. The classical Chinese word qing 青 "green; blue; black", representing the distinction of blue and green in various languages, is a better known example of Chinese-English alternative translations. Compare the color range across collocations like qīngcài 青菜 "green vegetables; greens", qīngjīn 青筋 "blue veins", qīngtiān 青天 "azure sky", qīngbù 青布 "black cloth", or qīngkèmǎ 青騍馬 "gray mare".

Translation equivalents of xuanchuan in major Chinese-English dictionaries include:
"to declare; propaganda"
"propaganda; to carry on propaganda (for)"
"propagate; propagandize; publicize; propaganda (work, bureau, etc.)"
"conduct propaganda; propagate; disseminate; give publicity to"
"propagate; disseminate; propagandize; give publicity to; publicize"
"to publicize; to promote; propaganda; promotion"
"publicize; propagate; advocated; advertise; preach; blaze sth. abroad [about]; whoop"
"propagate; disseminate; give publicity to"

Many languages besides English have different words to distinguish "propaganda" and "publicity", for instance, German Propaganda and Werbung, or Russian propagánda пропага́нда and rekláma рекла́ма. Few languages besides Chinese have one polysemous word; excluding Sinoxenic loanwords from Chinese such as Japanese senden 宣伝 "propaganda; advertisement; publicity", one example is Irish bolscaireacht "publicity; propaganda; claptrap.

Historical usages
The Hanyu Da Cidian is a historical dictionary that gives chronologically arranged usage examples, comparable with the Oxford English Dictionary. The xuanchuan entry gives three meanings: xuānbù chuándá 宣布传达 "to announce or convey information", xiàng rén jiạ̌ngjiě shuōmíng 向人讲解说明, 进行教育, jìnxíng jiàoyù 进行教育 " to explain something to someone, or to conduct education", and chuánbō 传播, xuānyáng 宣扬 "to disseminate or publicize".

First, the meaning of "to announce or convey information" was originally recorded in the historian Chen Shou's (3rd century) Records of the Three Kingdoms in contexts of transmitting (esp. military) orders. For example, the biography of Shu Han dynasty General Ma Zhong (Shu Han) (d. 249) records that after defeating rebels in Nanyue, he was appointed General Who Pacifies the South and ordered back to the capital in Chengdu. "In 242, when [Ma Zhong] was returning to court, upon reaching Hanzhong, he went to see Grand Marshall Jiang Wan, who conveyed an imperial decree that he was also appointed General in Chief of Zhennan Circuit [in modern Nanchang, Jiangxi]." Later usage examples are cited from historian Li Baiyao (564–647), poet Cao Tang 曹唐 (fl. 860–874), and scholar Wang Mingqing 王明清 (1163-1224).

Second, the xuanchuan meaning of "to explain something to someone, or to conduct education" first appeared in Ge Hong's (c. 320) Baopuzi criticism of effete scholars who Emperor Zhang of Han (r. 75–88) extravagantly rewarded.
These various gentlemen were heaped with honors, but not because they could breach walls or fight in the fields, break through an enemy's lines and extend frontiers, fall ill and resign office, pray for a plan of confederation and give the credit to others, or possess a zeal transcending all bounds. Merely because they expounded an interpretation [xuanchuan] of one solitary classic, such were the honors lavished upon them. And they were only lecturing upon words bequeathed by the dead. Despite their own high positions, emperors and kings deigned to serve these teachers. 
Subsequent usages are quotes from monk-translator Pukong 不空 or Amoghavajra  (705–774), poet Wang Yucheng (954–1001), novelist Ba Jin (1904-2005), and Mao Zedong (1893-1976). Mao's (1957) "The speech for the Chinese Communist party National Propaganda Work Meeting" says, "Our comrades who are engaged in propaganda work have the task of disseminating Marxism. This is a gradual [task of] propaganda and should be done well, so that people are willing to accept it."

Third, the modern xuanchuan meaning of "to disseminate or publicize" occurred in Lao She's (1937) Camel Xiangzi or Rickshaw Boy, "As promised, Old Man Liu told no one of Xiangzi’s experiences [selling stolen wartime camels for 30 yuan], but the camel story quickly spread from Haidian into the city." The Hanyu Da Cidian gives two other usage examples from novels by Zhao Shuli (1906-1970).

The Nihon Kokugo Daijiten (2001) entry for the Japanese word senden 宣伝 differentiates three meanings and notes their earliest recorded usages: "Convey a statement, transmit widely" (述べ伝えること. ひろく伝えること.; c. 758-797 Shoku Nihongi); "Explain to people the existence or effect of a thing, principle, policy, etc., seeking their understanding. Or such movement or activity. Propaganda" (ある物の存在や効能または主義主張などを人々に説明し, 理解を求めること. また, その運動や活動. プロパガンダ.; 1924, Kanson Arahata's Entering Russia); and "Spread a rumor that is unrealistic or exaggerated" (事実以上に大げさに言いふらすこと.; 1930 Riichi Yokomitsu's Machine).

Propaganda and publicity
Whether xuanchuan is translated as either propaganda or propagandize versus  publicity or  publicize depends upon the Chinese collocation and context, and the English semiotic connotations. For English and Chinese translation equivalent examples, political propaganda and zhèngzhì xuānchuán 政治宣传 are usually pejorative, but public health propaganda and gōnggòng wèishēng xuānchuán 公共卫生宣传 are not.

Some xuanchuan collocations customarily refer to "propaganda" (e.g., xuānchuánzhàn 宣传战 "propaganda war"), others to "publicity" (chǎnpǐn xuānchuán 產品宣传 "product promotion"), and still others can ambiguously refer to either (xuānchuányuán 宣传员 "propagandist; publicist").Xuanchuan contexts can vary from covert black propaganda (such as astroturfing) that misrepresents its source to overt white propaganda (such as a public service announcement) that truthfully states its source. Chinese contexts determine the word's semantic connotations. For instance, the term Gòngchạ̌ndǎng de xuānchuán 共产党的宣传 "Communist propaganda" generally has positive connotations in Chinese Communist Party usage but negative ones in Kuomintang usage. In official CCP discourse, xuanchuan "propaganda" has a neutral or positive connotation, but in informal usage, the word often has a pejorative connotation. For instance, in 2009 a group of Chinese academics and lawyers called for a boycott of the major China Central Television network and sarcastically said the program Xinwen Lianbo "Network News" should be called Xuanchuan Lianbo "Propaganda News".

David Shambaugh, the scholar of Chinese politics and foreign policy, describes "proactive propaganda" in which the Chinese Communist Party Propaganda Department writes and disseminates information that it believes "should be used in educating and shaping society". In this particular context, xuanchuan "does not carry negative connotations for the CCP, nor, for that matter, for most Chinese citizens." The sinologist and anthropologist Andrew B. Kipnis says unlike English propaganda, Chinese xuanchuan is officially represented as language that is good for the nation as a whole. "Although no American government would describe its own declarations as propaganda, the CCP is proud of its xuanchuan."Propaganda and publicity have undergone considerable diachronic change in meaning. According to the Oxford English Dictionary, propaganda was first recorded in 1718, referring to the Latin title Congregatio de Propaganda Fide "Congregation for the Propagation of the Faith" "a committee of Cardinals of the Roman Catholic Church having the care and oversight of foreign missions". The religious meaning was extended to "any association, systematic scheme, or concerted movement for the propagation of a particular doctrine or practice" in 1790, and specialized to "the systematic propagation of information or ideas by an interested party, esp. in a tendentious way in order to encourage or instill a particular attitude or response" in 1908. The linguist Adrian Room suggests that the "bad" sense of propaganda emerged on the political scene in the United States. Publicity was first used to mean "the quality of being public; the condition or fact of being open to public observation or knowledge" in 1791, and subsequently specified to "public notice; the action or fact of making someone or something publicly known; the business of promotion or advertising; an action or object intended to attract public notice; material issued to publicize".

Most standard English dictionary definitions of propaganda note the word's negative connotations; either through explanation "ideas or statements that are often false or exaggerated and that are spread in order to help a cause, a political leader, a government, etc." (Merriam-Webster's Collegiate Dictionary 1993), or through a usage note "The systematic dissemination of doctrine, rumour, or selected information to propagate or promote a particular doctrine, view, practice, etc.; ideas, information, etc. disseminated thus (frequently derogatory)" (Shorter Oxford English Dictionary 1993).

In contrast, standard Chinese-Chinese dictionary definitions of xuanchuan (see the Hanyu Da Cidian above) neither mention that the term can have a pejorative connotation nor highlight any connection between the act of propagandizing and the accuracy (or inaccuracy) of the information that is being disseminated.

As China's involvement in world affairs grew in the late 20th century, the CCP became sensitive to the negative connotations of the English word propaganda, and the commonly used Chinese term xuanchuan acquired pejorative connotations. In 1992, Party General Secretary Jiang Zemin asked one of the CCP's most senior translators to come up with a better English alternative to propaganda as the translation of xuanchuan for propaganda targeting foreign audiences. Replacement English translations include publicity, information, and political communication domestically, or media diplomacy and cultural exchange internationally.

CCPPD officials left the xuanchuan in official Chinese names the same but changed the English translations from "Propaganda Department of the Communist Party of China" to "Publicity Department of the Communist Party of China", and changed "Central Propaganda Department" to "Central Publicity Department". English-languages sources rarely use either "Publicity Department" translation. The Zhōngyāng Xuānchuán Sīxiǎng Lǐngdǎo Xiǎozǔ, which oversees the CCPPD, continues to be translated as the "Central Leading Group for Propaganda and Ideological Work".

When Ding Guangen, director of the CCP Central Propaganda Department from 1992 to 2002, traveled abroad on official visits, he was known as the Minister of Information.

References
 
 
 

Footnotes

Further reading
Feuerwerker, Yi-tsi Mei (1982), Ding Ling's Fiction: Ideology and Narrative in Modern Chinese Literature, Harvard University Press.
Ling Yuan, ed. (2002), The Contemporary Chinese Dictionary (Chinese-English Edition), Foreign Language Teaching and Research Press.
Sahlins, Marshall (2014), Confucius Institutes: Academic Malware, The Asia-Pacific Journal, Vol. 12, Issue 45.1.

External links
Who is really spinning the propaganda?, China Daily'', 13 May 2009.

Chinese words and phrases
Propaganda
Propaganda in China